Beltrami may refer to:

Places in the United States
Beltrami County, Minnesota
Beltrami, Minnesota
Beltrami, Minneapolis, a neighborhood in Minneapolis, Minnesota

Other uses
Beltrami (surname)